Boris Mihailovich de Zirkoff (– 4 March 1981) was an American Theosophist, editor and writer.

Biography 

Boris de Zirkoff was born in Saint Petersburg, Russia on March 7, 1902. His father was Mihail Vassilyevich de Zirkoff, a Russian general. His mother was Lydia Dmitriyevna von Hahn, who was a second cousin to Helena Petrovna Blavatsky.

The Russian Revolution forced his family to flee in 1917 to Stockholm across Finland. Boris studied in some European universities, where he specialized in languages and classics. "At Baden-Baden in Germany, he met a Russian American, Nikolai Romanoff, and learned from him about the existence, at Point Loma, close San Diego in California, of the organization, named Universal Brotherhood and Theosophical Society. He wrote a letter to Mrs. Katherine Tingley, then head of the Society, and when she visited Europe, they met in Finland. Mrs. Tingley, who had learned that Boris was Blavatsky's relative, invited him to come to the headquarters at Point Loma and promised him all the necessary help in regard to his travel to America." He performed this journey towards the end of 1923.

Blavatsky's Collected Writings 
In 1924, while residing at the Headquarters of the Point Loma Theosophical Society, Boris resolved to compile Blavatsky's writings. This plan led to a worldwide correspondence and over 50 years of research. The first four volumes were published between 1933 and 1936 by "Rider & Co." as The Complete Works of H. P. Blavatsky, however, this edition forms were destroyed during World War II. These volumes were recovered only in 1966–69. Between 1950 and 1981, Boris managed to publish the first 12 volumes of Blavatsky's Collected Writings. "From his manuscripts for Volumes XIII and XIV the remaining numbered series were completed in 1982 and 1985. And a Cumulative Index Volume XV was then published in 1991."

From 1944 to 1981, De Zirkoff edited in Los Angeles a magazine Theosophia. According to WorldCat, Boris had written 49 works. In 1980, he was awarded the Subba Row Medal.

Published works 
 H. P. Blavatsky's Collected Writings (alternative). 15 vols. Wheaton, Ill: Quest Books/Theosophical Publishing House, 1933–1991 (with Dara Eklund as assistant ed.)
 
 
 
 
 

Translations

Notes

References

Sources

External links
 H.P. Blavatsky Collected Writings Online. 
 Theosophia.
 A PDF of the final issue of Theosophia.

1902 births
1981 deaths
Emigrants from the Russian Empire to the United States
American Theosophists